List of botanical gardens and arboretums in Washington may refer to:

 List of botanical gardens and arboretums in Washington (state)
 List of botanical gardens and arboretums in Washington, D.C.